Lucia Stafford (born August 18, 1998) is a Canadian athlete specializing in middle-distance running.  She is the 2017 Pan American U20 champion in the women's 1500 metres, and competed for Canada at the 2020 Tokyo Olympics. Stafford is the North American indoor record holder for the 1000 metres.

Career
Stafford was born in London, Ontario and grew up in Toronto. Her father James Stafford was a former competitive runner and represented Canada at four World Cross Country Championships. She and her older sister Gabriela DeBues-Stafford initially trained in competitive Irish dancing, but DeBues-Stafford switched to running, subsequently joined by Stafford to spend more time with her father and sister. Both sisters were diagnosed with Graves' disease as teenagers, with Stafford's case proving a considerable hindrance in her early career.

In 2017, Stafford won gold at the 2017 Pan American U20 Athletics Championships in the women's 1500 metres event. She was accepted to the University of Toronto to study civil engineering, and while there, competed for the Varsity Blues. At the 2019 Summer Universiade, Stafford finished in fifth in the 4x400 relay and the 1500 m.

The onset of the COVID-19 pandemic resulted in the cancellation of much of the 2020 athletic season and the 2020 Summer Olympics in Tokyo being delayed by a full year. For Stafford, this afforded her time to recover from a thyroid procedure that she credited with allowing her to train more consistently. In July 2021, Stafford was named to Canada's 2020 Olympic team in the women's 1500 m event, alongside her sister. She qualified to the semi-final, but finished thirteenth overall there, 0.43 seconds behind Spain's Marta Pérez, and missed advancing to the final. Her time of 4:02.12	was a new personal best.

In advance of the 2022 season, Stafford moved to train at the Bowerman Track Club in Portland, joining her sister Gabriela. However, they would both depart the club early in the following year, citing controversy around another club member, Shelby Houlihan. Stafford made her World Indoor debut at the 2022 edition in Belgrade, finishing eighth in the 1500 m. She went on to make her World Athletics Championships debut as well, but came thirty-fourth in the heats of the 4:09.67 and did not advance to the semi-finals. She was also named to Canada's team for the 2022 Commonwealth Games in Birmingham, but her preparations were hindered by contracting COVID-19. Despite this, she qualified to the 1500 m final and finished eleventh, albeit well off her personal best. Stafford reflected that "all you can ask for yourself is to do your best. I know it's very far from where I want to be, but I always count on myself to do my best."

On January 28, 2023, Stafford broke the North American indoor record in the 1000 metres with a time of 2:33.75 at the Boston University John Thomas Terrier Classic in Boston. She moved to ninth on the world indoor all-time list.

Personal life
The daughter of James Stafford and Maria Luisa Gardner, Stafford has, in addition to her sister Gabriela, a younger brother Nicholas and two younger step-sisters, Gabrielle and Talia. She has a step-mother, Leanne Shafir. Her mother passed away due to leukemia when Lucia was 10. Both Gabriela and Lucia are trilingual, speaking English, French and Spanish.

Competition record

References

External links
 

1998 births
Living people
Athletes from Toronto
Canadian female track and field athletes
Sportspeople from London, Ontario
Athletes (track and field) at the 2020 Summer Olympics
Olympic track and field athletes of Canada
21st-century Canadian women